Harbi may refer to:

Persons 
Harbi al-Himyari, semi-legendary alchemist and teacher of Jabir ibn Hayyan
Ahmed Harbi (born 1986), an Israeli-born Palestinian footballer
Mahmoud Harbi (1921 – 1960), a Somali politician
Mohamed Harbi (born 1933), an Algerian historian and member of the National Liberation Front (FLN)
Rashida Tlaib (born 1976), an American politician born Rashida Harbi

See also 

Al-Harbi (surname)
 Harb (tribe)